The Filmfare Award for Best Actress is given by Filmfare as part of its annual Filmfare Awards for Hindi films, to recognise the female actor who has delivered an outstanding performance in a leading role. The award was first given in 1954 for the films released in the preceding year 1953.

Winners and nominees

1950s

1960s

1970s

1980s

1990s

2000s

2010s

2020s

Multiple wins and nominations

The following individuals have received two or more Best Actress awards:

The following individuals have received nine or more Best Actress nominations:

Superlatives

 Nutan and her niece Kajol, with five wins each, have maximum awards. Meena Kumari, Madhuri Dixit and Vidya Balan have four wins each. Vyjayanthimala, Jaya Bachchan, Shabana Azmi, and Alia Bhatt have three wins each. Eight actresses have won the award twice; in chronological order, they are Waheeda Rehman, Dimple Kapadia, Rekha, Sridevi, Karisma Kapoor, Aishwarya Rai, Rani Mukerji and Deepika Padukone.
 Madhuri Dixit and Rani Mukerji are the overall most nominated performers in the female acting categories, each with overall 17 nominations. Dixit has 14 nominations for Best Actress and three for Best Supporting Actress, and Mukerji has 10 nominations for Best Actress and seven nominations for Best Supporting Actress. Additionally, Rani Mukerji has 2 wins for Best Actress (Critics).
 Meena Kumari achieved an unusual feat by garnering all of the nominations in 1963 with no other actress being nominated (3 nominations that year). No other actress has equaled this record.
 Six actresses have won the award in consecutive years; in chronological order, they are Meena Kumari (1954–55), Jaya Bachchan (1974–75), Shabana Azmi (1984–85), Rani Mukerji (2005–06), Vidya Balan (2012–13) and Alia Bhatt (2019-20).
 There has been only one tie in the history of this category. This occurred in 1974 when Dimple Kapadia and Jaya Bachchan tied for the award, winning for Bobby and Abhimaan respectively.
 Madhuri Dixit holds the record for the maximum Best Actress nominations with 14, followed by Meena Kumari, Vidya Balan with 12, Hema Malini, Kajol with 11 nominations each, and Rani Mukerji, Aishwarya Rai, and Sridevi with 10 nominations each. Dixit and Balan have the most awards in a single decade with four awards each in the 1990s and the 2010s respectively. Dixit also holds the record for most consecutive nominations with 10 between 1989 and 1996.
 On occasion of an actress receiving multiple nominations in the same year and won in either of them: Shabana Azmi received four nominations in 1984 and holds the record for the highest number of nominations in a single year. Meena Kumari and Kajol received three nominations each in 1963 and 1999 respectively. Vyjayanthimala, Jaya Bachchan, Raakhee, Rekha, Shabana Azmi, Sridevi, Madhuri Dixit, Aishwarya Rai, Preity Zinta, Rani Mukerji, Vidya Balan, Deepika Padukone, and Alia Bhatt each received two nominations in 1959, 1974, 1977, 1981, 1985, 1990,1995, 2000, 2004, 2006, 2012, (2014 and 2016), and 2017 respectively. Deepika Padukone is the only actress who achieved this feat twice in 2014 (2 nominations) and 2016 (2 nominations), and won in both years.
 On the occasion of an actress receiving multiple nominations in the same year but failed to win in any of them: Jaya Bachchan, Madhuri Dixit and Kareena Kapoor each received two nominations in 1972, 1996 and 2010 respectively, where Hema Malini is the only actress who achieved this feat twice in 1975 and 1976 but won in none of the years.
 Vyjayanthimala is the only actress to win the maximum awards, without ever losing, whenever been nominated. She received three awards among four nominations, being nominated twice in 1959 and once each in 1962 and 1965, winning in all three years. She was also the first actress to win both the Best Actress Award and Best Supporting Actress Award as well as the first actress to receive multiple nominations.
 Tabu holds the record of maximum nominations without ever winning, with six, followed by Mala Sinha, Saira Banu, Manisha Koirala, Urmila Matondkar, Anushka Sharma and Sonam Kapoor with four nominations each, followed by Jaya Prada, Parineeti Chopra with three nominations.
 Nutan, who won the award for the fifth time in 1979 at the age of 42 for Main Tulsi Tere Aangan Ki, is the eldest winner, while Sharmila Tagore became the eldest nominee in 2006 at the age of 61 for Viruddh. Dimple Kapadia, in 1973, became the youngest winner and youngest nominee at the age of 16 for Bobby.
 Meena Kumari had the most wins in the 1950s with two awards, winning them consecutively. Nutan peaked with three wins in the '60s. Jaya Bachchan ruled the '70s with two wins. Shabana Azmi and Rekha fetched two wins each in the '80s. In the '90s, Madhuri Dixit had four wins. Aishwarya Rai, Rani Mukerji and Kajol had two wins each in the 2000s which were the highest. Vidya Balan was the most successful actress of 2010s with four wins.
 Only once have siblings been nominated during the same year: Karisma Kapoor for Zubeidaa and Kareena Kapoor for Aśoka in 2002.
 Juhi Chawla became the first actress who won the Filmfare Award for Best Female Debut before winning for Best Actress, followed by Preity Zinta (2004), Kareena Kapoor (2008), Priyanka Chopra (2009), Vidya Balan (2010), Deepika Padukone (2014) and Kangana Ranaut (2015).
 14 actresses who have won both Best Actress and Best Supporting Actress awards include Vyjayanthimala, Raakhee, Padmini Kolhapure, Nutan, Dimple Kapadia, Rekha, Karishma Kapoor, Jaya Bachchan, Madhuri Dixit, Rani Mukerji, Kareena Kapoor, Kangana Ranaut, Priyanka Chopra, and Shabana Azmi. Rani Mukerji is the only actress to win both these awards in the same year (2005). On three occasions, actresses were nominated for both these awards in the same year: Aishwarya Rai in 2001 (for Hamara Dil Aapke Paas Hai and Mohabbatein), Mukerji again in 2008 (for Laaga Chunari Mein Daag and Saawariya), and Anushka Sharma in 2016 (for NH10 and Dil Dhadakne Do) without winning either.
 Nine actresses have won in both Best Actress and Best Actress – Critics categories; in chronological order, they are Dimple Kapadia, Karisma Kapoor, Rani Mukerji, Kareena Kapoor, Priyanka Chopra, Vidya Balan, Kangana Ranaut, Alia Bhatt and Taapsee Pannu. Rani Mukerji is the only actress to win both these awards for the same role in the same year (2006).
 Only three actresses have won in all four big categories – Best Actress, Best Actress (Critics), Best Supporting Actress and  Best Female Debut; in chronological order, they are Kareena Kapoor, Priyanka Chopra and Kangana Ranaut.
 Nutan and Raakhee were nominated for both Best Actress and Best Supporting Actress for the same performance: Nutan for Saudagar (1974) and for Main Tulsi Tere Aangan Ki (1979) and Raakhee for Doosra Aadmi (1978); Nutan won Best Actress award for Main Tulsi Tere Aangan Ki (1979).
 Vidya Balan and Rani Mukerji are the two actresses nominated in the leading role of the same franchise. Balan was nominated for Kahaani and Kahaani 2: Durga Rani Singh in 2013 and 2017 respectively, where she won for the former; Mukerji was nominated for Mardaani and Mardaani 2 in 2015 and 2020 respectively, but did not win for either.
 Dimple Kapadia and Lakshmi are the only actresses who won the award for their debut films Bobby and Julie respectively.
 Kangana Ranaut's nomination for Thalaivii (2022) was rescinded, following a social media outburst in which she accused Filmfare of biased votes.

References

External links
 Filmfare Nominees and Winners
 Filmfare Award Winners

Actress
Film awards for lead actress